Ikerasak Strait is a strait in the Avannaata municipality in northwestern Greenland.

Geography 
The strait is located in central Tasiusaq Bay. It separates Uigorlersuaq Island in the north from Paagussat Island in the south, and from Tasiusaq Island in the east.

References 

Tasiusaq Bay
Straits of the Upernavik Archipelago